Aparajita Varman, (fl. c. 885-903 CE) commonly referred as Aparajita, was a king of the Pallava dynasty. Considered as the last known ruler of the Pallavas, he was defeated and killed in c. 897 CE in a battle against Aditya I. The Pallava dynasty rule at Tondaimandalam came to an end thereafter as the Pallava territories were ceded into the Chola Empire.  In 880 CE, Aparajita fought a battle against the Pandya ruler Varagunavarman II and had him defeated.

Reign 
A depiction of Somaskanda on the rear wall of the sanctum of a temple commissioned by him in Tiruttani is regarded as the last known use of that stylistic tradition. In 885 he transferred the rule of Thanjavur to his ally and vassal Aditya I as a reward for his contribution to the victory at Thirupurambiyam. The Cholas under Aditya I at first were minor allies of the Pallavas, but later attacked them, defeated and killed Aparajitavarman, thus marking the end of the Pallava dynasty in South India.

References 

Pallava kings